Phosinella is a genus of minute sea snails, marine gastropod mollusks or micromollusks, in the family Rissoinidae.

Species
Species within the genus Phosinella include:
 
 † Phosinella alexisi (Ladd, 1966)
Phosinella allanae (Laseron, 1950)
Phosinella angusta (Laseron, 1956)
 Phosinella apicina (Laseron, 1956)
 † Phosinella awana (Yokoyama, 1924) 
Phosinella bellula (A. Adams, 1851)
 † Phosinella briggsi (Ladd, 1966) 
 Phosinella caelata (Laseron, 1956)
Phosinella cancellata (Philippi, 1847)
 Phosinella cancellina (Rolán & Fernández-Garcés, 2010)
Phosinella cartieri (Hornung & Mermod, 1929)
Phosinella clathrata (A. Adams, 1853)
 † Phosinella collinsii (Gabb, 1881) 
Phosinella cyatha (Laseron, 1956)
 Phosinella decepta (Laseron, 1956)
Phosinella digera (Laseron, 1956)
Phosinella dunkeriana Kuroda & Habe in Habe, 1961 
Phosinella elevata (Laseron, 1956)
Phosinella emina (Laseron, 1956)
Phosinella exasperata (Souverbie, 1866)
 † Phosinella fargoi (Olsson & Harbison, 1953) 
 Phosinella fenestrata (Schwartz von Mohrenstern, 1860)
Phosinella hungerfordiana (Weinkauff, 1881)
 Phosinella hystrix (Souverbie, 1877)
Phosinella infratincta (Garrett, 1873)
Phosinella media (Schwartz, 1860)
Phosinella nitida (A. Adams, 1853)
Phosinella nodicincta (A. Adams, 1853)
 † Phosinella oncera (Woodring, 1957) 
Phosinella paenula (Laseron, 1956)
Phosinella phormis (Melvill, 1904)
 Phosinella privati (de Folin, 1867)
 Phosinella proxima (Laseron, 1956)
 Phosinella pulchra (C. B. Adams, 1850)
 Phosinella redferni (Espinosa & Ortea, 2002)
Phosinella retecosa (Thiele, 1925)
 Phosinella sagraiana (d'Orbigny, 1842)
Phosinella scabra (Garrett, 1873)
Phosinella schmackeri (Boettger, 1887)
Phosinella seguenziana (Issel, 1869)
Phosinella sincera (Melvill & Standen, 1896)
 Phosinella spinulosa Paulmier, 2017
Phosinella sumatrensis (Thiele, 1925)
Phosinella teres (Brazier, 1877)
Phosinella ultima (Laseron, 1956)
Phosinella warnefordiae (Preston, 1908)

Species brought into synonymy
 Phosinella castaneogramma [sic]: synonym of Rissoina costatogranosa Garrett, 1873 (based on a lapsus)
 Phosinella conifera (Montagu, 1803): synonym of Rissoina conifera (Montagu, 1803) (Not a Phosinella)
 Phosinella costatogranosa (Garrett, 1873): synonym of Rissoina costatogranosa Garrett, 1873
Phosinella deshayesiana (Récluz, 1843):synonym of Rissoa deshayesiana Récluz, 1843 synonym of Chrysallida excavata (Philippi, 1836): synonym of Folinella excavata (Phillippi, 1836)
Phosinella fractura (Laseron, 1956): synonym of Phosinella media (Schwartz von Mohrenstern, 1860) (junior synonym)
 Phosinella gemmea (Hedley, 1899): synonym of Rissoina gemmea Hedley, 1899
 Phosinella pura (Gould, 1861): synonym of Phosinella media (Schwartz von Mohrenstern, 1860) (junior synonym)
 Phosinella scabra [sic]: synonym of Phosinella scaba (Garrett, 1873) (misspelling)

References

 Iredale, T., 1955 [1953]. Rissoid sectional names. Proceedings of the Royal Zoological Society of New South Wales 74: 81
 Laseron, C. F. (1956). The families Rissoinidae and Rissoidae (Mollusca) from the Solanderian and Dampierian zoogeographical provinces. Australian Journal of Marine and Freshwater Research. 7 (3): 384-484.

External links
 Mörch, O. A. L. (1876). Synopsis molluscorum marinorum Indiarum occidentalium imprimis insularum danicarum. Malakozoologische Blätter. 23: 45-58, 87-143
 Ponder W. F. (1985) A review of the genera of the Rissoidae (Mollusca: Mesogastropoda: Rissoacea). Records of the Australian Museum supplement 4: 1-221

Rissoinidae